Arleta may refer to:

Places 
Arleta, Los Angeles, a neighborhood 
Arleta, Oregon, United States, a neighborhood of Portland

People
Arleta (musician) (1945–2017), Greek musician
Arleta (given name) (includes list of people with this given name)